Maiquetía is a city located in the Central Region of Venezuela, in the state of Vargas. It is at approximately 19 m above sea level on a small shelf between the Caribbean and the mountains behind it. Caracas, the Venezuelan capital, is approximately 37 km to the southeast.

Maiquetía is mainly a commercial center. The historic center has many narrow streets lined with stores and a market. The main road in this part of the city is the Avenida Carlos Soublette. The recent geopolitical divisions in Vargas makes Maiquetía no longer include the Simón Bolívar International Airport, the most important one in the country and the commercial airport serving Caracas. Conviasa, the Venezuelan flag carrier airline, is headquartered in the city. Even though the airport is now in the state of Vargas, it has kept the name Maiquetía, which cause some confusion among locals and foreigners alike.

The city forms a conurbation with La Guaira with which it is linked via Avenida Soublette. Given its proximity to Caracas and seafront location, it offers an optimal location for some hotels.

Maiquetía suffered the devastating effects of torrential rains and mudslides during the 1999 Vargas tragedy.

Climate
Maiquetía has a tropical savannah climate (Aw) with hot, humid days and warm nights year round.

Sports
The city is home to the basketball team Bucaneros de La Guaira. The team plays its home games at the Polideportivo José María Vargas.

References

External links

Cities in Vargas (state)
Populated places established in 1670
1670 establishments in the Spanish Empire